The Juno Award for "Rock Album of the Year" has been awarded since 1991, as recognition each year for the best rock album in Canada.  The award has been called a number of other names, including the "Best Hard Rock/Metal Album" and "Best Rock Album".

Winners

Best Hard Rock/Metal Album (1991)

Hard Rock Album of the Year (1992 - 1993)

Best Hard Rock Album (1994 - 1995)

Best Rock Album (1996)

North Star Rock Album of the Year (1997)

Blockbuster Rock Album of the Year (1998)

Best Rock Album (1999 - 2002)

Rock Album of the Year (2003 - Present)

See also
:Category:Canadian rock music groups
:Category:Canadian rock musicians

References

Rock Album
Album awards
Rock music awards